The Helm is a mountain in the Puster Valley in South Tyrol, Italy.

References 
 Peter Holl: Alpenvereinsführer Karnischer Hauptkamm, Bergverlag Rudolf Rother, Munich, 1988, 
 Raimund von Klebelsberg: Geologie von Tirol, Berlin, 1935
 Tabacco-Verlag: Carta topografica 1:25,000, Blatt 010, Sextener Dolomiten

External links 

Mountains of the Alps
Mountains of South Tyrol
Carnic Alps